The Pie Rouge des Plaines is a  modern French breed of dairy cattle. It was created in about 1970 by cross-breeding the traditional Armorican cattle of Brittany, in north-western France, with red-pied cattle of the Dutch Meuse-Rhine-Yssel and German Deutsche Rotbunte breeds.

History 

The Pie Rouge des Plaines is a modern breed. In 1970, farmers raising the traditional red-pied Armorican cattle in the three western départements of Brittany – Côtes-d'Armor, Finistère and the Morbihan – took the decision to merge their breed with red-pied cattle of Germany and the Netherlands, through a  programme of extensive cross-breeding with German Rotbunt and Dutch Meuse-Rhine-Yssel stock, to create a new dairy breed with good meat-producing qualities. A breeders' association, the Eleveurs de la Race Française Pie Rouge des Plaines, was formed, and a herd-book was opened for the new breed in 1970  or 1971. From 1982 an attempt was made to increase size and udder quality by introducing Red Holstein blood; however, the resulting stock was less successful for beef production.

The Pie Rouge des Plaines is concentrated mainly in Brittany, where about 80% of the total herd is found; it is also distributed in Normandy, and – to a lesser extent – in the Massif Central. Frozen semen from some 150 bulls is available for artificial insemination.

The original Armorican breed has become rare: it was listed by the FAO as "critically endangered" in 2007. In 2005, the population was estimated at about 240 head, and in 2014 it was 263.

Characteristics 

The Pie Rouge des Plaines is red-pied, with short crescent-shaped horns. The skin, muzzle and mucosa are pale. Cows have good resistance to mastitis.

Use 

Pie Rouge des Plaines has good dairy  aptitude. The milk has 4.3% fat and 3.3% protein. Meat production also contributes to profitability.

References 

Cattle breeds originating in France
Cattle breeds